The International Save the Children Union was a Geneva-based international organisation of children's welfare organisations founded in 1920 by Eglantyne Jebb and her sister Dorothy Buxton, who had earlier founded Save the Children in the UK. The intention was to create 'a powerful international organisation, which would extend its ramifications to the remotest corner of the globe'.  

The movement was granted the patronage of the International Committee of the Red Cross, and the Council included two prominent members of that body, including its Head of Secretariat, Etienne Clouzot. It brought together organisations from various countries that were initially working to tackle child suffering around Europe after World War I.

In 1923, it agreed, and then lobbied for, the Declaration of the Rights of the Child which was adopted by the League of Nations in the following year.

In 1946, it merged with the International Association for the Promotion of Child Welfare (founded 1921 in Brussels) to form the International Union for Child Welfare (French: Union internationale de protection de l'enfance).

In 1977, a number of Save the Children organisations formed the International Save the Children Alliance to coordinate their international advocacy work.

In 1986, the General Council of the International Union for Child Welfare voted to disband the organisation, allegedly for reasons of financial mismanagement. Its papers and those of its predecessor bodies were deposited in the archives of the Canton of Geneva.

References

External links
 La Déclaration de Genève (in french)
 History of International Save the Children Alliance
 Save the Children UK - account of the foundation of International Save the Children Union
Archives of the canton of Geneva (in French)
 Save the Children Australian site
 Lessons in Leadership

Save the Children